Hotel Broadway was a musical TV show broadcast on the now-defunct DuMont Television Network. The 30-minute show ran from January 20, 1949, to March 17, 1949. The show starred singer Jerri Blanchard and was produced by Harvey Marlowe.

Format
A variety of comedians and singers appeared on the program each week, with no host. The Striders quartet introduced the acts as they appeared.

Episode status
As with most DuMont series, no episodes are known to survive.

See also
List of programs broadcast by the DuMont Television Network
List of surviving DuMont Television Network broadcasts

Bibliography
David Weinstein, The Forgotten Network: DuMont and the Birth of American Television (Philadelphia: Temple University Press, 2004) 
Alex McNeil, Total Television, Fourth edition (New York: Penguin Books, 1980) 
Tim Brooks and Earle Marsh, The Complete Directory to Prime Time Network TV Shows, Third edition (New York: Ballantine Books, 1964)

References

External links
Hotel Broadway at IMDB
DuMont historical website

DuMont Television Network original programming
1940s American variety television series
1949 American television series debuts
1949 American television series endings
Black-and-white American television shows
Lost television shows